The Rainbow Series (sometimes known as the Rainbow Books) is a series of computer security standards and guidelines published by the United States government in the 1980s and 1990s. They were originally published by the U.S. Department of Defense Computer Security Center, and then by the National Computer Security Center.

Objective 
These standards describe a process of evaluation for trusted systems. In some cases, U.S. government entities (as well as private firms) would require formal validation of computer technology using this process as part of their procurement criteria. Many of these standards have influenced, and have been superseded by, the Common Criteria.

The books have nicknames based on the color of its cover. For example, the Trusted Computer System Evaluation Criteria was referred to as "The Orange Book." In the book entitled Applied Cryptography, security expert Bruce Schneier states of NCSC-TG-021 that he "can't even begin to describe the color of [the] cover" and that some of the books in this series have "hideously colored covers." He then goes on to describe how to receive a copy of them, saying "Don't tell them I sent you."

Most significant Rainbow Series books

References

External links
 Rainbow Series from Federation of American Scientists, with more explanation
 Rainbow Series from Archive of Information Assurance

Computer security standards